Outpost is a video game developed and published by Sierra On-Line in 1994. The game was noteworthy for having a hard science fiction approach, with one of the main designers being a former NASA scientist.

Outpost was released for Windows 3.1 and the Macintosh. It was followed by a loosely related sequel, Outpost 2: Divided Destiny.

Story
A massive asteroid named Vulcan's Hammer is detected to be on a collision course with Earth, and all attempts to divert it from this path have failed. The last attempt, firing a large nuclear warhead at the asteroid, actually ended up splitting it not into five chunks (which would have averted disaster) as humanity hoped, but rather two asteroids. Now, instead of destroying the earth, it will simply wipe out nearly all life on Earth's surface. Extinction is not an option, and so a mission is organized to create a colony on a world elsewhere in the galaxy as the last hope for mankind's survival. The player is in charge of that mission.

Reception
Initial reviews of Outpost were enthusiastic about the game. The American version of PC Gamer rated the game at 93%, one of its highest ratings ever for the time. It was later made known that the reviewers had in fact played beta versions of the game, and had been promised certain features would be implemented, but never were.

Indeed, many of the features described in the game's own documentation simply did not exist in the game at all. These included the ability to enter diplomatic relations with the rebel colony and the ability to build roads, orbital colonies, or the mass driver.  Many of these gameplay aspects were later patched in, though in appearance only, as many of them failed to have any meaningful effect on gameplay.

Following the release of the game, the game's general bugginess and perceived mediocre gameplay, along with the lack of features described in most of the game's reviews and the game's own documentation led to a minor backlash against the computer game magazines of the time by consumers who bought the game based on their reviews.

In 1996, Computer Gaming World declared Outpost the worst computer game ever released.

See also
 SimMars
 OutpostHD

References

External links
Outpost Universe - The Outpost Universe is a community for the Outpost series games by Sierra/Dynamix.

IE PC game review - Outpost (1994), Interactive Entertainment, hosted on YouTube, uploaded: 11 April 2010, Retrieved: 1 April 2011.

1994 video games
Windows games
Classic Mac OS games
Outpost
Fiction about near-Earth asteroids
Video games with isometric graphics
City-building games
Video games about impact events
Sierra Entertainment games
Single-player video games
Video games developed in the United States